Tony Luetkemeyer (born September 21, 1983) is an attorney and the state senator for the 34th Senatorial District of the Missouri Senate, representing Buchanan and Platte Counties in Northwest Missouri. He is a member of the Republican Party.

Personal life 
Luetkemeyer is a lifelong Missourian. He grew up in Southeast Missouri in Farmington.

Luetkemeyer attended college at the University of Missouri, where he graduated with Bachelor of Arts degrees in history and political science, magna cum laude. During college, he was elected president of the undergraduate student government, the Missouri Students Association. During the summer after college, Luetkemeyer served as an intern in Washington D.C. at the White House, where he worked in the Domestic Policy Council during the administration of President George W. Bush.

Luetkemeyer attended law school at the University of Missouri, where he earned his Juris Doctor, magna cum laude, and was inducted into the Order of the Coif. While in law school, he was appointed by former Missouri Governor Matt Blunt to serve as the Student Representative to the University of Missouri Board of Curators.

After law school, Luetkemeyer clerked for Patricia Breckenridge on the Supreme Court of Missouri. He began his law practice as an attorney at Shook Hardy & Bacon in Kansas City, where he focused on defending individuals and businesses in tort litigation.

Luetkemeyer lives in Parkville, Missouri and is married to Lucinda H. Luetkemeyer.

Missouri Senate
Committees

Luetkemeyer was sworn into the Missouri Senate on January 9, 2019, as a member of the 100th General Assembly. He has served on the following committees:

Judiciary and Civil and Criminal Jurisprudence, Chairman (2019–present)
Appropriations (2021–present)
Government Accountability and Fiscal Oversight (2021–present)
Government Reform (2019-2020)
General Laws (2019-2020)
Gubernatorial Appointments (2019–present)
 Rules, Joint Rules, Resolutions and Ethics (2019–present)

Senate Leadership 
In November 2020, Luetkemeyer was elected by the Missouri Senate Republican Caucus to serve as the Senate Majority Whip for the 101st General Assembly. Shortly after the 2022 General Election, Luetkemeyer was elected as the Caucus Chairman of the Missouri Senate Republicans for the 102nd General Assembly.

Legislation 
Senate Bill 678 & Senate Joint Resolution 38 - Kansas City Police Funding

At the start of the 2022 legislative session, Luetkemeyer filed Senate Bill 678 and companion Senate Joint Resolution 38 in response to attempts by Kansas City's mayor and city council to strip over $42M from the Kansas City Police Department's budget. A Missouri court later ruled the city's attempt unlawful. SB 678 increased the minimum funding required for the KCPD up from 20% to 25% of the city's general revenue. Governor Mike Parson signed SB 678 into law at KCPD Headquarters on June 27, 2022. SJR 38 was placed on the November General Election ballot as Amendment 4, which provided an exception in the Missouri Constitution to a prohibition on the legislature mandating increased funding for services by local government. On November 8, 2022, Amendment 4 passed overwhelming with more than 63% of Missourians voting in favor.

Senate Bill 600 - Violent Crime

During the 2020 legislative session, Luetkemeyer sponsored Senate Bill 600, an omnibus criminal law bill aimed at curbing the rise of violent crime in Missouri. The bill passed on a largely partisan vote in the House of Representatives on the last day of the 2020 session. The bill was introduced in the wake of Missouri's three largest cities—St. Louis, Kansas City and Springfield—being listed among the top 15 most dangerous cities in America, according to USA Today. Shortly after the USA Today report, Luetkemeyer wrote an opinion piece in the Kansas City Star, where he stated: "Without commonsense reforms to Missouri’s sentencing laws and criminal code, to give prosecutors and law enforcement more tools to fight violent crimes, our cities will continue to languish on the list of the country’s most dangerous." The major components of Senate Bill 600 include provisions:

• Limiting the ability of judges to grant probation to certain dangerous felons;

• Enhancing penalties for the offenses of armed criminal action and unlawful possession of a weapon;

• Modernizing the state's criminal conspiracy law;

• Creating the Missouri Criminal Street Gangs Prevention Act (similar to the federal RICO law); and

• Establishing the new felony offense of vehicle hijacking.

The bill was supported broadly by state and local law enforcement agencies and prosecutors. On February 20, 2020, Luetkemeyer was named Legislator of the Year by the Missouri Association of Prosecuting Attorneys for his efforts to "protect and defend the rights of crime victims, the profession of prosecution and the criminal justice system." The bill was signed into law on July 6, 2020.

Senate Bill 676 - Tax Reform

In 2019, homeowners across Missouri saw dramatic increases in their real property tax assessments, leading to a record number of assessment appeals. Many property owners received late notice of those increases, effectively depriving them of the ability to challenge the assessments. In response to those concerns, Luetkemeyer filed Senate Bill 676. As finally passed, the legislation put in place several key protections for homeowners, including extending the time for homeowners to appeal assessments and requiring a physical inspection of the property when an assessment increases by 15% or more. In the event of a 15% or greater assessment increase, the bill also shifts the burden of proving the accuracy of the assessment from the taxpayer to the assessor.

The bill also included a provision exempting from state income tax the individual stimulus checks many Missourians received as a part of the Coronavirus Aid, Relief and Economic Security (CARES) Act. Due to the structure of the state's tax code, Missouri was one of only six states that could have taxed the stimulus checks. The measure enjoyed broad bipartisan support, passing the Senate (30-0) and the House of Representatives (147-4). The bill was signed into law on July 14, 2020.

Senate Bill 53 & 60 - Law Enforcement & Public Safety

This bipartisan legislation included several key provisions relating to law enforcement and public safety.

 Removal of KCPD residency requirement - The legislation relaxes the residency requirement for Kansas City Police Department officers, allowing them to live within 30 miles of the city limits, on the Missouri side of the state line. The bill was similar to one passed during a special legislative session, which allowed St. Louis police officers to live within one hour of the city. KCPD was one of the few remaining police departments in the state to have a residency requirement. The bill increases officer recruitment at a time when the KCPD was down over 100 officers.
 Anti-Doxing - Doxing is a form on internet intimidation by which groups disclose private information about an individual to promote intimidation and harassment of that individual. After incidents of harassment of several KCPD officers, SB 53 created a new felony crime for harassing law enforcement officers or their families. 
 Confiscation of inmate stimulus checks - Another provision requires the Missouri Department of Corrections to seize federal COVID-19 relief checks received by inmates and to use the money to pay restitution to the offender's victims.
 Sheriffs pay - The bill also included a salary bump for county sheriffs. Sheriffs salaries typically fall well behind municipal police chief and state highway patrol captain salaries, making recruitment and retention more difficult.

Senate Joint Resolution 14 - Term Limits

During the First Regular Session of the 100th General Assembly, Luetkemeyer sponsored Senate Joint Resolution 14. The SJR passed the Missouri Senate 31-3 and the House of Representatives passed the measure on the last day of the 2019 legislative session. SJR 14 proposed amending the Missouri Constitution to impose term limits on all state elected officials. It was the only proposed amendment to the state constitution passed by the General Assembly during the 2019 legislative session. Since the 1990s, term limits of two four-year terms applied to members of the legislature, governor and state treasurer. Other statewide officials, including the lt. governor, secretary of state, auditor, and attorney general, were exempt from term limits.

SJR 14 was placed on the Nov. 3, 2020 ballot as Amendment 1. It narrowly failed in a statewide vote, 48.026% (Yes) to 51.974% (No). Historically, term limits have been broadly supported by Missouri's electorate, with term limits for governor passing by more than 72% in 1965, and legislative term limits passing by an even wider margin in 1992. Some believe Amendment 1 failed due to voter confusion, because another measure on the ballot—Amendment 3, which dealt with legislative ethics and redistricting—was opposed by millions of dollars on a "Vote No" campaign. No money was spent supporting Amendment 1.

Senate Bill 224 - Civil Discovery Rules

During his first year in office, Luetkemeyer sponsored Senate Bill 224, a measure that passed the Missouri legislature in the 2019 legislative session. SB 224 was modeled off several provisions of the Federal Rules of Civil Procedure relating to discovery, the process by which parties to a lawsuit gather evidence to support their case. The major features of SB 224 place certain presumed limitations on discovery, including the scope of discovery, the number and length of depositions, the number of interrogatories and requests for production, and discoverability of electronically stored information (ESI). SB 224 was championed by the business and tort reform communities as an efficiency measure to reduce the cost and length of litigation. Of the measure, Luetkemeyer stated: “These reforms will expedite lawsuits, ensure more timely resolution of disputes and reduce costs for all parties involved.” The bill was signed into law on July 10, 2019.

For his work on pro-business policies, Luetkemeyer was later recognized by the Missouri Chamber of Commerce and Industry as its 2019 Freshman Legislator of the Year.

Electoral history
Luetkemeyer was elected to the Missouri Senate in the November 7, 2018 general election, after advancing from the August 7, 2018 primary.

Primary -2018

In the primary, Luetkemeyer faced Republican challenger Harry Roberts, the then-Presiding Commissioner of Buchanan County. In one of the most hotly contested state primaries of the 2018 cycle, Luetkemeyer won the Republican nomination with 53.7% of the vote to Roberts’ 46.3%.

General - 2018

In the November 7, 2018 general election, Luetkemeyer faced Democratic challenger Martin T. Rucker II, a former NFL player and All-American tight end at the University of Missouri. In what ended up being the most competitive state senate general election of the year, Luetkemeyer won the race with 52.5% of the vote, compared to Rucker’s 47.5%.

General - 2022

Luetkemeyer ran unopposed in the 2022 Republican primary for state senate.  In the general election, Luetkemeyer faced Democratic opponent Sarah Shorter. Luetkemeyer was reelected with an over 18% margin, 59.1% (Luetkemeyer) to 40.9% (Shorter).

References 

Living people
Republican Party Missouri state senators
1983 births
People from Farmington, Missouri
People from Parkville, Missouri
21st-century American politicians